Fly My Kite is a 1931 Our Gang short comedy film directed by Robert F. McGowan. It was the 107th Our Gang short that was released.

Plot
Grandma, who recently sold her grocery store, is enjoying retirement with her beloved "grandchildren". She's actually a widow who outlived her only daughter, who was married but childless. Grandma lives in her son-in-law's house and he's in charge of her money, which he has mostly spent. Meanwhile, she is having fun with the Gang—she's not any one child's grandma but everyone's grandma. Her son-in-law, however, wants to remarry and he and his intended both want Grandma out of the house so they can move in.

He tells her to get her stuff and get out. He also tells her that she is broke and that he used up all the money from the store sale mere months ago. He says that she is old and that he cannot wait till she dies of old age because that could take forever. He even says he's arranged to have her sent to the Poor Farm.

Grandma confronts her son-in-law and the Gang attacks him up on the spot. He manages to escape the children's rampages and then tells Grandma to leave immediately. He finds a letter informing her that she has savings bonds and to communicate with the bank right away. He goes to the bank and discovers they are indeed worth $100,000 dollars (by today's standards about $5 million).  As Grandma is packing, she finds the bonds that she still thinks have no worth. Chubby is flying a kite with Dickie and the kite does not stay up. Grandma tells him the tail needs more weight and uses the bonds to get the kite to fly.

Grandma's son-in-law returns to the house, purposely breaks her glasses (she thinks it is accidental) and pretends to read a letter that her bonds are worthless. She tells him that the bonds are on the tail of Chubby's kite. He runs outside and tries to take the kite away from Chubby. Grandma then reads the letter (magnified through a goldfish bowl) and learns the truth. She sends the Gang out to help Chubby keep her son-in-law from getting the kite. The Gang runs out and beats Grandma's son-in-law to a pulp (Including dragging him over a board studded with nails). They bust his watch (tit-for-tat for him breaking Grandma's glasses). They saw a telephone pole he is climbing to get the kite away from him. He falls in a large puddle and Mary Ann gets the bonds and hands them to Grandma after she got a police officer to arrest Dan for kicking her out of the house and trespassing onto her property.

Cast

The Gang
 Matthew Beard as Stymie
 Norman Chaney as Chubby
 Dorothy DeBorba as Dorothy
 Allen Hoskins as Farina
 Bobby Hutchins as Wheezer
 Mary Ann Jackson as Mary Ann
 Shirley Jean Rickert as Shirley
 George Ernest as Georgie
 Dickie Jackson as Dickie
 Charles "Chic" Sales Jr. as Our Gang member
 Jackie Williams as Our Gang member
 Pete the Pup as himself

Additional cast
 Mae Busch as Dan's new wife
 Margaret Mann as Margaret 'Grandma' Mann
 Jim Mason as Dan, the son-in-law
 Broderick O'Farrell as Bond agent

See also
 Our Gang filmography

References

External links

1931 films
1931 comedy films
American black-and-white films
Films directed by Robert F. McGowan
Hal Roach Studios short films
Our Gang films
Films with screenplays by H. M. Walker
1930s American films